HD 111915 is a single star in the southern constellation of Centaurus. It has the Bayer designation e Centauri, while HD 111915 is the star's identifier in the Henry Draper Catalogue. This is an aging giant star with a stellar classification of K3-4III. It is faintly visible to the naked eye with an apparent visual magnitude of +4.33. The distance to this star is approximately 294 light years based on parallax.

References 

K-type giants
Centaurus (constellation)
Centauri, e
Durchmusterung objects
111915
062867
4888